Finlay Turner Christie (born 19 September 1995) is a Scottish born New Zealand rugby union player who currently plays as a halfback for  in the Bunnings NPC and the  in Super Rugby.

Youth career
Christie was born in Scotland, but moved to New Zealand aged 7 and settled down in the city of Pukekohe where he shone both at gymnastics and rugby during his schooldays. Christie attended Saint Kentigern College where he played for the college's top side. He eventually chose to pursue a rugby career and represented  at under 19 level before heading south to Christchurch for university.   This decision started to pay off in 2016 when he was awarded the Hawkins Medal as Canterbury's top club rugby player for his performances for the University of Canterbury.

Bunnings NPC
Christie's performances at club level saw him sign with Mitre 10 Cup side  for the 2016 Mitre 10 Cup season. Christie made his debut in Round 1 against Waikato at Lansdowne Park in Blenheim scoring a try. He was part of the Tasman side that won the Mitre 10 Cup for the first time in 2019. In Round 9 of the 2020 Mitre 10 Cup Christie played his 50th game for the Mako against  at Lansdowne Park in Blenheim.

Super Rugby
Following his impressive first season at provincial level, he signed with Super Rugby side the  ahead of the 2017 Super Rugby season. At the end of the 2017 season Christie signed with the Hurricanes for the 2018 Super Rugby season. In 2018 Christie made 6 appearances for the Hurricanes scoring a try on debut against the Sunwolves in Wellington. Christie was named in the South Island squad for the North vs South rugby union match in 2020 coming off the bench in a 38–35 win for the South.

All Blacks 
After an outstanding 2021 Super Rugby season Christie was named in the All Blacks squad to play Tonga and Fiji in the July Steinlager Series. He made his debut against Tonga at Mount Smart Stadium, coming off the bench in a 102–0 win for the All Blacks, becoming All Black number 1196. He played a further 4 test matches in 2021 and after more outstanding performances in Super Rugby he was again selected for the All Blacks in 2022.

References

1995 births
Living people
Blues (Super Rugby) players
Chiefs (rugby union) players
Hurricanes (rugby union) players
New Zealand international rugby union players
People educated at Saint Kentigern College
People from Pukekohe
Rugby union players from Peebles
Rugby union scrum-halves
Scottish emigrants to New Zealand
Tasman rugby union players